Orange Township is one of the fourteen townships of Shelby County, Ohio, United States.  The 2000 census found 1,419 people in the township.

Geography
Located in the southern part of the county, it borders the following townships:
Clinton Township - north
Perry Township - northeast
Green Township - east
Brown Township, Miami County - southeast
Springcreek Township, Miami County - south
Washington Township, Miami County - southwest
Washington Township - west

A small portion of the city of Sidney, the county seat of Shelby County, is located in northern Orange Township, and the unincorporated community of Kirkwood lies in the township's southwest.

Name and history
Orange Township was established in 1820. It is one of six Orange Townships statewide.

Government
The township is governed by a three-member board of trustees, who are elected in November of odd-numbered years to a four-year term beginning on the following January 1. Two are elected in the year after the presidential election and one is elected in the year before it. There is also an elected township fiscal officer, who serves a four-year term beginning on April 1 of the year after the election, which is held in November of the year before the presidential election. Vacancies in the fiscal officership or on the board of trustees are filled by the remaining trustees.

References

External links
County website

Townships in Shelby County, Ohio
Townships in Ohio